A trace table is a technique used to test algorithms in order to make sure that no logical errors occur while the calculations are being processed. The table usually takes the form of a multi-column, multi-row table; With each column showing a variable, and each row showing each number input into the algorithm and the subsequent values of the variables.

Trace tables are typically used in schools and colleges when teaching students how to program. They can be an essential tool in teaching students how certain calculations works and the systematic process that is occurring when the algorithm is executed. They can also be useful for debugging applications, helping the programmer to easily detect what error is occurring, and why it may be occurring.

Example 
int i, x = 0;
for (i = 1; i <= 10; i++) 
{
    x = i * 2;
}

See also 

 Algorithms
 Programming languages
 Debugging

References 
 http://www.comscigate.com/tutorial/KjellStyle/WilliamChen/trace1.html
 http://www.thevickerage.worldonline.co.uk/theteacher/alevel/assem/assem5.htm - archived version
 http://portal.newman.wa.edu.au/technology/12infsys/html/KWH2003/TraceTables.htm - archived version

Debugging